Taylor Township is one of thirteen townships in Owen County, Indiana, United States. As of the 2010 census, its population was 1,020 and it contained 461 housing units.

Geography

Unincorporated towns
 Devore at 
 Quincy at 
 Wallace Junction at 
(This list is based on USGS data and may include former settlements.)

Cemeteries
The township contains Combes Cemetery.

Major highways
  U.S. Route 231

School districts
 Cloverdale Community Schools

Political districts
 State House District 46
 State Senate District 37

References
 
 United States Census Bureau 2009 TIGER/Line Shapefiles
 IndianaMap

External links
 Indiana Township Association
 United Township Association of Indiana
 City-Data.com page for Taylor Township

Townships in Owen County, Indiana
Townships in Indiana